Mary Burns, Fugitive is a 1935 American drama film directed by William K. Howard.

Sylvia Sidney plays a small-town coffee-shop owner who falls for a gangster, ends up in prison and then released in a scheme to trap him.

Plot
Mary Burns (Sylvia Sidney) runs a small roadside coffee shop near a rural town.  She's desperately in love with 'Babe' Wilson (Alan Baxter), a young man who has fallen in love with Mary after coming to her coffee shop several times.  However, Mary isn't aware that Babe is a gangster wanted for robbery and murder.

Babe and his partner in crime arrive at the coffee shop, and Babe tells Mary he has to go to Canada right away on “business”, but he wants them to get married immediately and go away with him.  Unfortunately, Mary doesn't know that Babe's suitcase is filled with stolen loot.

As they prepare to leave, the police arrive to arrest Babe, but he kills his own partner to prevent him from testifying, then he escapes and leaves Mary to be arrested and convicted for aiding and abetting a known criminal.

After serving three years of her fifteen-year sentence, Mary escapes with a fellow female inmate, Goldie Gordon (Pert Kelton), unaware that Goldie is actually cooperating with the police.  They want to use Mary to lure Babe out of hiding.  Mary gets a job as a maid at a hospital, and she meets Barton Powell (Melvyn Douglas), a famous explorer and writer who is recovering from snow blindness.  They fall in love after Mary spends several weeks reading to the blind man and talking with him about his adventures.

When one of Babe's accomplices, Spike (Brian Donlevy), comes to the small apartment that Mary and Goldie share and says he's taking her to Babe, Mary flees and goes to the hospital to see Barton one last time.  She doesn't tell him she's leaving forever, she simply slips out quietly after he falls asleep.

Mary travels from Oklahoma to Utah and hides out in a small town, but Babe finds her and tries to abduct her during a church service.  However, the police have tracked Mary to the small town. Undercover men among the congregation try to arrest Babe, but he shocks the crowd by producing a hand grenade, and he threatens to pull the pin if they don't let him leave with Mary.  Babe and Mary escape, and he instructs her to hide again until he can find a way to rejoin her.

Mary is terrified of the homicidal killer, and she hopes he won't find her, but the police succeed in doing so again, and Detective Harper (Wallace Ford), the policeman in charge of the manhunt, takes her to Barton Powell's rustic lakeside house to reunite the couple.  Barton has recovered his sight and sees Mary for the first time with his own eyes.  He promptly proposes, and Mary accepts.

Detective Harper and his men stake out Barton's lakeside home and wait for Babe to show up to get Mary.  But the wily killer manages to sneak into the house, and he threatens to shoot Barton if Mary doesn't leave with him.

Mary pretends she's about to kiss Babe, but she reaches inside his coat, takes hold of a second pistol in his shoulder holster, and pulls the trigger several times, killing Babe.  Afterwards, Detective Harper sees to it that Mary's criminal record is expunged, and she marries Barton.

Cast
 Sylvia Sidney as Mary Burns
 Melvyn Douglas as Barton Powell
 Alan Baxter as Babe Wilson
 Pert Kelton as Goldie Gordon
 Wallace Ford as Harper
 Brian Donlevy as Spike
 Esther Dale as Kate
 George Chandler as Cashier
 William Ingersoll as Judge

Reception
The film earned a profit of $29,089.

Notes

Bibliography
 EAMES, John Douglas, The Paramount Story, London: Octopus Books, 1985

External links
 
 
 
 

1935 films
1935 drama films
1930s prison films
American black-and-white films
American prison drama films
Films directed by William K. Howard
Films produced by Walter Wanger
Films scored by Heinz Roemheld
Paramount Pictures films
1930s English-language films
1930s American films